is the 24th single by Japanese idol group Nogizaka46. The single was released on 4 September 2019. It reached number-one on the weekly Oricon Singles Chart and remained on the chart for twenty-four weeks.
Additionally, the single was also number-one on the Billboard Japan Hot 100.

The center position of the title track is held by Sakura Endo, a fourth generation member; additionally, two other fourth generation members, Haruka Kaki and Ayame Tsutsui, were placed in the first row. This single marks the first time a fourth generation member participated in a title track or held a center position. It is also the last single that former captain Reika Sakurai participated in.

Release 
This single was released in 5 versions. Type-A, Type-B, Type-C, Type-D and a regular edition.

Track listing
All lyrics written by Yasushi Akimoto.

Type-A

Type-B

Type-C

Type-D

Regular Edition

Participating members

Yoake Made Tsuyogaranakutemoii

Centre: Sakura Endō

3rd Row: Minami Umezawa, Hinako Kitano, Kazumi Takayama, Shiori Kubo, Manatsu Akimoto, Minami Hoshino, Mai Shinuchi

2nd Row: Mizuki Yamashita, Erika Ikuta, Mai Shiraishi, Sayuri Matsumura, Reika Sakurai, Yūki Yoda

1st Row: Miona Hori, Haruka Kaki, Sakura Endō , Ayame Tsutsui, Asuka Saitō

"Boku no Koto, Shitteru?"
Sing Out Senbatsu:

Centre: Asuka Saitō

1st Generation: Manatsu Akimoto, Erika Ikuta, Sayuri Inoue, Asuka Saitō, Reika Sakurai, Mai Shiraishi, Kazumi Takayama, Minami Hoshino, Sayuri Matsumura

2nd Generation: Hinako Kitano, Mai Shinuchi, Ayane Suzuki, Miona Hori, Miria Watanabe

3rd Generation: Riria Itō, Renka Iwamoto, Minami Umezawa, Momoko Ōzono, Shiori Kubo, Tamami Sakaguchi, Kaede Satō, Yūki Yoda

Romendensha no Machi

Asuka Saitō, Miona Hori, Mizuki Yamashita

"Toshoshitsu no Kimi e"
4th Generation: 

Centre: Sayaka Kakehashi  

4th Generation: Sakura Endo, Haruka Kaki, Sayaka Kakehashi, Saya Kanagawa, Yuri Kitagawa, Yuna Shibata, Rei Seimiya, Mayu Tamura, Ayame Tsutsui, Seira Hayakawa, Mio Yakubo

“Tokidoki Omoidashite Kudasai"

Reika Sakurai

"~Do my best~ Ja Imi wa Nai"
Under Members: 

Centre: Renka Iwamoto 

1st Generation: Kana Nakada, Hina Higuchi, Maaya Wada 

2nd Generation: Junna Itō, Kotoko Sasaki, Ayane Suzuki, Ranze Terada, Rena Yamazaki, Miria Watanabe 

3rd Generation: Riria Itō, Renka Iwamoto, Tamami Sakaguchi, Kaede Satō, Reno Nakamura, Hazuki Mukai, Ayano Christie Yoshida

"Boku no Omoikomi"
Senbatsu (選抜) 

Centre: Sakura Endō 

1st Generation: Manatsu Akimoto, Erika Ikuta, Asuka Saitō, Reika Sakurai, Mai Shiraishi, Kazumi Takayama, Minami Hoshino, Sayuri Matsumura

2nd Generation: Hinako Kitano, Mai Shinuchi, Miona Hori

3rd Generation: Minami Umezawa, Shiori Kubo, Mizuki Yamashita, Yūki Yoda

4th Generation: Sakura Endō, Haruka Kaki, Ayame Tsutsui

Chart performance

Oricon

Billboard Japan

Year-end

References

2019 singles
2019 songs
Japanese-language songs
Nogizaka46 songs
Oricon Weekly number-one singles
Billboard Japan Hot 100 number-one singles
Songs with lyrics by Yasushi Akimoto